Black Oak is a small unincorporated community in Barr Township, Daviess County, Indiana.

It was named for the presence of black oak trees.

Geography

References

Unincorporated communities in Daviess County, Indiana
Unincorporated communities in Indiana